Ala Zoghlami (born 19 June 1994) is a Tunisian born Italian male middle-distance runner and steeplechaser. He competed at the 2020 Summer Olympics, in 3000 m steeplechase.

He has a twin, also an athlete, named Osama.

Biography
Obtained the IAAF standard for participating in the 2017 World Championships, in the quarter-finals of the events he sets his personal best, resulting in the first of the missed for the semi-finals for only 32 cents a second.

Personal best
3000 m steeplechase: 8:17.65 -  Rovereto, 27 June 2021

Achievements

National titles
Ala Zoghlami won seven national championships at individual senior level.

Italian Athletics Championships
5000 m: 2020 (1)
3000 m steeplechase: 2017, 2020, 2021 (3)
Italian Cross Country Championships
Short course: 2021, 2022, 2023 (3)

References

External links

1994 births
Living people
Italian male middle-distance runners
Italian male steeplechase runners
World Athletics Championships athletes for Italy
Italian twins
Tunisian twins
Twin sportspeople
Tunisian emigrants to Italy
Athletics competitors of Fiamme Oro
Italian sportspeople of African descent
Italian Athletics Championships winners
Athletes (track and field) at the 2020 Summer Olympics
Olympic athletes of Italy